Inga adenophylla is a species of tree in the family Fabaceae. It is native to South America, particularly the countries of Bolivia and Peru.

Description
Inga adenophylla is a small tree that grows from 300  2800 meters in elevation. Inga adenophylla grows in the countries of Bolivia and Peru. The fruit pulp produced by the tree tastes sweet and is edible. The tree is sometimes used to provide shade for workers at coffee and tea plantations.

References

adenophylla
Trees of Bolivia
Trees of Peru
Trees of South America